Bashkir State University is located in Ufa, Bashkortostan, Russia, founded in 1909, is a classical university of Russia.

History

Bashkir State University is a center for postgraduate studies which provides postgraduate courses in 56 scientific majors and doctoral courses in 8 scientific majors. There are 10 doctoral and 3 candidate dissertation councils which are responsible for defense and awarding academic degrees in 23 majors.

It is home to  Bashkirians, as well as Russian scientists, researchers, mathematicians, economists, and poets. Many applied mathematicians and physicists were among the faculty at Bashkir State University, including Academicians Nikolay Bogolyubov, Alexei Leontiev, and Professor of Philology Gabdulkhay Kh. Akhatov. In Ufa (from 1941 to 1943) Academician Bogolyubov developed his method of averaging. Graduated from the University of poet Mustai Karim.

Academics

Institutes and faculties 
Bashkir State University faculties are: Bashkir Academy of Comprehensive Business Safety and Security, Institute of Law, Institute of Physics and Technology, Faculty of Bashkir Philology and Journalism, Faculty of Biology, Faculty of Chemistry, Faculty of Economics, Faculty of Geography, Faculty of History, Faculty of Chemistry and Technology, Faculty of Mathematics and Information Technologies, Faculty of Philology, Faculty of Philosophy and Sociology, Faculty of Psychology, Faculty of Romance and Germanic Philology, Faculty of public professions, Faculty of public professions, College BSU.

General departments 
 Department of Life Safety and Environment Protection;
 Humanities Foreign Languages Chair;
 Natural Faculties Department of Foreign Languages;
 Department of Pedagogy;
 The Department of Physical Education and Sport.

Notable alumni

Mustai Karim – Bashkir Soviet poet, writer and playwright.
Maxim Tchoudov  –  Russian biathlete.
 Alexander Kazhdan – Soviet-American Byzantinist.
Hadiya Davletshina – Bashkir poet.
Radiy Khabirov - the current Head of the Republic of Bashkortostan since 11 October 2018, also the Candidate of Law.
 Khairulla Murtazin  – Russian mathematician.
 Liya Shakirova – Soviet and Russian linguist.
 Rinad Yulmukhametov – Russian mathematician.
 Fanuza Nadrshina-  Bashkir folklorist

Branch

The university has branches in Sterlitamak, Birsk, Uchaly, Sibai, Neftekamsk.

See also

 Education in Russia
 List of universities in Russia

References

External links
 Bashkir State University official website

 
Educational institutions established in 1909
1909 establishments in the Russian Empire
Universities in Bashkortostan
Education in Ufa
Buildings and structures in Ufa